George Hazelwood Locket (12 October 1900 – 27 January 1991) was a British arachnologist who shared the 1974 H. H. Bloomer Award with A. F. Millidge. He was a co-writer of Millidge's British Spiders, volumes I and II. He studied at the University of Oxford.

References 

British arachnologists
Alumni of the University of Oxford
Zoologists with author abbreviations
1900 births
1991 deaths
20th-century British zoologists